Recreational drug use in Kenya is common among men, women, and youth from both rural and urban environments. The drugs reported to have been used include cigarettes, tobacco, kuber, shisha, packaged alcohol, chang'aa, hashish, bhang, cocaine, heroin, khat, inhalants, prescription drugs (sedatives or sleeping pills, morphine, codeine, pethidine), and synthetic drugs (amphetamine, hallucinogens, mandrax). In recent years, recreational drug use has led to instances of abuse which can be traced to several causes including social stigma, poor parenting and poverty, and peer pressure. Some of the major effects are violence, the utilization of healthcare services, greater risk of contracting HIV, chemical dependence, and social stigma. Local communities and the national government have made efforts to address these issues.

History 
Recreational drug use has changed in tandem with historical developments. In precolonial times, for example, Kenyan society allowed for drug use such as alcohol consumption albeit only during cultural activities. The right to use drugs, including alcohol, was exclusively enjoyed by mostly male elders within Kenyan communities. Youth and women, on the other hand, were barred from such activities.  Before the advent of colonialism, Kenyans consumed alcoholic drinks such as chang'aa and toivo. They also chewed, smoked, or inhaled tobacco leaves, khat leaves, and marijuana leaves.

With the growth in trade from colonialism, access to alcohol grew. Over time, the concept of a social community was diminished. Kenyans accepted the new economic opportunities birthed by colonialism and experienced a cultural shift towards the individual. As the traditional family structure weakened, the informal limits upon the usage of alcohol and other drugs were lessened. Contrary to past traditions, individuals of various demographics now engage in recreational drug use, which can lead to the abuse of these substances.

Source of Drugs 
Kenya is classified as a weak but independent state, implying that the state lacks a unified government lead military force. This creates room for informal actors who are able to conduct their illicit affairs with little fear of state intervention. Other conditions such as severe governmental corruption, weakened institutions, and stable financial and transportation services make Kenya an optimal destination and transit point for drug traffickers. More specifically, a report by the United Nations Office on Drugs and Crime (UNODC) stated that there were significant quantities of heroin being seized in areas along the east coast of Africa with most of the heroin originating from Afghanistan.

The sea is often the travel path chosen by traffickers, and so areas that are most affected by drug trafficking are found on the coast. Examples of such areas include Lamu, Malindi, and Mombasa. There have also been instances of drug trafficking occurring through international airports.

Alcoholic drinks are typically brewed domestically, with traditional liquor being the most accessible. There exists a difference between rural and urban environments as alcohol is usually brewed at home in rural areas while alcohol is distributed through businesses in urban areas.

Causes

Institutionalized Homophobia and Social Stigma 
Kenya is conservative in its view of members of the LGBTQ community and has criminalized sexual activity that is non-heterosexual. This attitude is expressed legally through the Kenyan Penal Code. Under Section 162 of the Kenyan Penal Code, any person "who has carnal knowledge of any person against the order of nature is guilty of a felony and liable to imprisonment for fourteen years." Section 165 criminalizes homosexual acts, decreeing that any male who "commits any act of gross indecency with another male person...is guilty of a felony and liable to imprisonment for five years."

Given the legal institutionalization of homophobia, some suffer harassment from state officials, particularly men who have sex with men (MSM). A report conducted by the Kenya National Commission on Human Rights found that due to the criminalization of same-sex activities, MSMs are frequently harassed, asked for bribes, and arrested under false charges by officers and state officials.

A 2017 study found that among the MSM in Kisumu, Kenya, "the prevalence of severe depressive symptoms is substantially higher (11.4%) than the 4% estimated for the general Kenyan population." Among the study's participants, "50.1% reported harmful alcohol abuse" and "23.8% reported moderate substance abuse." Given the conservative social environment, MSM used alcohol and illicit substances as a means of coping. It may also have been used as a solution to the depressive mental conditions.

In recent years, LGBTQ members in Kenya have attempted to push for legislation to decriminalize these types of sexual activity.

Peer pressure 
Peer pressure is a major factor contributing towards drug abuse. One study published in the Bangladesh e-Journal of Sociology found that there was a significant risk of drug abuse among female Kenyan youth in Mikindu with 24.14% of participants having begun their drug usage due to peer pressure. Users had been encouraged to take drugs for the apparent benefits that one could feel from taking these drugs. Some female youth began taking drugs due to the influence from their spouses. Some would take drugs under the premise that they would lead to strength and courage, allowing for them to face those who had wronged them in the past.

Effects

Violence 
Violence occurs within the private/domestic sphere as well. A study published by the Journal of Youth Studies found that under the influence of these substances, male youth were more likely to force others into sexual intercourse due to substance-induced aggression, while girls were more likely to be victims. Focus group discussions with female victims showed that women believed "… it is not their wish but it is those things [alcohol and other drugs] that they use," highlighting the strong influence of such substances on the actions of these male youth. The 2012 Report compiled by the National Authority for the Campaign Against Alcohol and Drug Abuse found that those who used alcohol and bhang were more likely to exhibit violence behavior towards family members. For example, "32.4% of alcohol and 28.6% of bhang users reported being violent to a spouse/partner or a family member."

Utilization of Healthcare Services 
Kenyan women who actively engage in drug-injecting can jeopardize their health and the health of their fetuses during pregnancies. Drug-injecting can lead to amenorrhea, resulting in women being unaware that they are even pregnant until further along. This lack of awareness resulted in pregnant women failing to follow certain practices and habits to ensure the health of their fetuses.

Drug use also creates a dilemma for women as they weigh the choices of either searching for more drugs or traveling to clinics to receive better care. Women under the influence of drugs feel a need to satisfy their cravings, viewing them as a priority before attending medical appointments. They also consider the possibility that staying at a clinic for a long duration due to long queues can lead to withdrawal symptoms.

For the time being, there are few health providers who fully understand how to treat women who have injected drugs.

Greater Risk of HIV 
One of the more long-term effects brought about by drug use in Kenya is the transmission of HIV among the populace. Under the effects of drugs, those who engage in sexual activities are more likely to make rash and impulsive decisions. Research on women's drug usage in coastal cities of Mombasa and Kilifi found that the sharing of needles among drug users was common. However, despite understanding the risks attached to such behavior, participants continued to share needles.

Drug use can aid the spread of HIV through transactional relationships. In terms of the makeup of study participants, "53% were single and 27% were cohabiting," leading to conditions by which women exchanged sex for "drugs, protection from the police, and accommodation." A search for drugs, in particular, poses certain health risks, as sexual intercourse with strangers serves to heighten the risk of contracting HIV. Similarly, sex workers are susceptible to contracting HIV due to drug use during work.

Chemical Dependence 
Chemical dependence refers to various indicators such as "craving for the substance, needing the substance first thing in the morning; concern by someone close to the respondent or a doctor about the person's drug consumption habits." The report indicated that between the age range from 15 to 65, tobacco was the most addictive substance with 62.3% of users expressing a craving for it. 21%, 44%, and 34.4% of alcohol, bhang, and miraa users, respectively, expressed similar cravings.

Social Stigma 
A report published by the Harm Reduction Journal examined the impact of stigma faced by women on the Kenyan Coast who injected drugs. Based on the information collected from interviews with study participants who had injected drugs, the researchers formed several conclusions with regards to stigma. The types of stigma included:

 Self-Stigmatization: Participants reported internal feelings of shame and low self-esteem due to having injected drugs coupled with a lack of sense of worth. They also associated their actions with a negative label known as "teja" which means "an injecting drug user."
 External Stigmatization: Participants also reported feeling excluded by those around them. Some noted that their families expressed apathy towards them for having used drugs. There were also instances in which the stigma attached to drug use led to drug users being perceived as petty criminals. The role of gender also arose as the stigma of drug use among women was accentuated by the fact that traditionally, men were drug users.

According to the study, the stigma of drug use can impede women's access to healthcare. Some women shared their concerns that being identified as a drug user would influence the quality of their interactions with healthcare workers, as certain workers would question the reason and method by which they should provide for the drug users. Some also opted to hide their identities to ensure that they would receiving proper care.

Local Response 
The local community plays a role in regulating the consumption of alcohol and other drugs. According to interviews with members of Kuikui, Baringo North, there is a general  respect and concern within the community for the well-being of others. If, for example, a youth is caught drinking alcohol or using drugs, the word of a village elder can be sufficient for the youth to cease his or her behavior. The family is also capable of guiding relatives or immediate family members away from alcohol and other drugs.

Government Response  
Aware of the negative effects of alcoholism and other drug abuse, the Kenyan government has made an active effort in recent years towards informing and preventing the populace from abusing these substances through policy. The Tobacco Control Act of 2007 was designed to protect individuals from disease and death caused by tobacco. It also aimed to better inform consumers on the risks associated with smoking, while preventing those under the age of 18 from purchasing tobacco products. In 2010, The Alcoholic Drinks Control Act was passed with the aim of protecting "the health of individuals  by providing a legal framework to control sale, production & consumption of alcoholic drinks." It also sought to better educate the general populace of the risks of alcohol consumption. These efforts to regulate the hours of operation for bars and prohibit the sale of alcohol to individuals under 18 years of age. These rules, however, are frequently broken as customers will pay bribes or bar owners will refuse to adhere to the rules, as they may diminish profits.

The Kenyan government has also cooperated with UNODC and the United Nations Programme on HIV/AIDS (UNAIDS)  in its effort to provide proper treatment to those who inject drugs. In Mombasa, the Kenyan government began a process of decentralization, creating 12 outpatient centers capable of providing drug dependence treatment. UNODC also pledged to provide training for "700 health professionals and civil society workers in HIV services" for those who inject drugs.

See also
Cannabis in Kenya

References

External links

Drugs in Kenya